Big Day Out 05 is a New Zealand compilation album released to coincide with the Big Day Out music festival in 2005.

Track listing
Rizzle Rizzle Nizzle Nizzle - Beastie Boys
Boom! - System of a Down
Stumblin - Powderfinger
Fall behind Me - The Donnas
Hard Act to Follow - Grinspoon
Two-Timing Touch and Broken Bones - The Hives
Fit But You Know It - The Streets
The Drop - Regurgitator
Not Many - The Remix - Scribe featuring Savage of the Deceptikonz and Con Psy of Frontline
Get a Life - Freestylers
Tonite - Concord Dawn
Get Yourself High - The Chemical Brothers featuring K-OS
Better World - Infusion
'Duality'''' - SlipknotCessation - The MusicSake Bomb - The D4Black Betty - SpiderbaitTonight's the Night - Little BirdyOlder Than You - Eskimo JoeSomething's Gotta Give - The John Butler TrioSection 12 (Hold Me Now)'' - The Polyphonic Spree

Music festival compilation albums
Compilation albums by New Zealand artists
2005 live albums
2005 compilation albums